The Power FM Network is a radio station network owned by media company ARN, who also own the Classic Hits Network.

In November 2021, Power FM, along with other stations owned by Grant Broadcasters, were acquired by the Australian Radio Network. This deal will allow Grant's stations, including Power FM, to access ARN's iHeartRadio platform in regional areas. The deal was finalized on January 4, 2022. It is expected the Power FM Network stations will integrate with ARN's KIIS Network, but will retain their current names according to the press release from ARN.

Stations

References

Power FM
Power FM
Australian Radio Network